The Serbia national futsal team represents Serbia in international futsal competitions such as the FIFA Futsal World Cup and the European Championships and is controlled by the Football Association of Serbia.

Results and fixtures

The following is a list of match results in the last 12 months, as well as any future matches that have been scheduled.
Legend

2021

2022

Coaching staff

Manager history

Players

Current squad
The following players were called up to the squad for the UEFA Futsal Euro 2022.
Head coach: Dejan Majes

Competitive record

FIFA Futsal World Cup

Remarks:
1 Qualified for the tournament, but was ejected due to the Yugoslav Wars.

UEFA Futsal Championship

Grand Prix de Futsal

References

External links
Official website

Serbia
Futsal
Futsal in Serbia
Men's sport in Serbia